Aure is a municipality in Møre og Romsdal county, Norway. It is part of the region of Nordmøre. The administrative centre is the village of Aure. Other villages in Aure include Gullstein, Stemshaug, Todalen, Tjeldbergodden, Arasvika, and Tømmervåg. Aure has one of the largest wooden churches in Norway, Aure Church.

The  municipality is the 179th largest by area out of the 356 municipalities in Norway. Aure is the 218th most populous municipality in Norway with a population of 3,384.

General information

The municipality was established on 1 January 1838 (see formannskapsdistrikt law). On 1 January 1894, the southern district of Aure (population: 942) was separated to form the new municipality of Valsøyfjord. Then on 1 July 1914, the northeastern district of Aure (population: 851) was separated to form the new municipality of Stemshaug.

During the 1960s, there were many municipal mergers across Norway due to the work of the Schei Committee. On 1 January 1965, Stemshaug Municipality (population: 877), the part of Valsøyfjord Municipality on the island of Ertvågsøya (population: 141), and the part of Tustna Municipality on Ertvågsøya (population: 85) were all merged into Aure. On 1 January 1976, the district of Aure located south of the Vinjefjorden (population: 158) was merged into the neighboring Halsa Municipality. On 1 January 2006, Tustna Municipality was merged into Aure.

Name
The municipality (originally the parish) is named after the old Aure farm, since the first Aure Church was built there. The name is the plural form of aurr which means "gravel".

Coat of arms
The coat of arms were granted on 21 December 2005, just before the merger of the municipalities of Tustna and Aure. They are based on the arms of the old municipality of Tustna, only the colors were changed. The arms show a white klippfisk (cod) on a blue background. The commercial production of cod in Norway started in Tustna around 1690.

Prior to 2006, the arms of Aure were red with the gold faces of two sea eagles facing opposite directions. There is a large population of these birds in Aure. These arms were granted on 22 March 1991 and they were used until 1 January 2006.

Churches
The Church of Norway has three parishes within the municipality of Aure. It is part of the Ytre Nordmøre prosti (deanery) in the Diocese of Møre.

Geography

The municipality includes many islands as well as some parts of the mainland. Islands of Aure include Ertvågsøya, Grisvågøya, Rottøya, Ruøya, Skardsøya, Solskjelsøya, Stabblandet, and Tustna. The Vinjefjorden, Arasvikfjord, and Edøyfjorden surround the municipality. Several bridges connect the islands including the Mjosund Bridge, Aursund Bridge, and Dromnessund Bridge.

Government
All municipalities in Norway, including Aure, are responsible for primary education (through 10th grade), outpatient health services, senior citizen services, unemployment and other social services, zoning, economic development, and municipal roads. The municipality is governed by a municipal council of elected representatives, which in turn elect a mayor.  The municipality falls under the Møre og Romsdal District Court and the Frostating Court of Appeal.
The current Mayor of Aure is Hanne Berit Brekken

Municipal council
The municipal council of Aure is made up of 19 representatives that are elected to four year terms. The party breakdown of the council is as follows:

Mayor
The mayors of Aure (incomplete list):
2019–present: Hanne Berit Brekken (Ap)
2007-2019: Ingunn Oldervik Golmen (Sp)
2006-2007: Hans G. Lauritzen (Ap)
1985-2006: Knut Baardset (H)

Economy
Agriculture and aquaculture employ 13.6% of the workforce, mostly within dairy farming, fishing, and fish farming. Manufacturing industry and construction employ 25.5%, where the most important industries are the shipyards in Mjosundet and the natural gas processing plant in Tjeldbergodden, as well as the Tjeldbergodden Reserve Power Station. A liquefied natural gas (LNG) pipeline from the Heidrun oil field terminates here. The remaining 60.5% work in the service industry.

Notable residents
 Paul Vighals (1886 in Aure – 1962) a Norwegian sport shooter; competed at the 1912 Summer Olympics
 Sivert Todal (1904 in Aure – 1988) a politician, Mayor of Aure 1951–1955 & 1955–1957
 Kristofer Leirdal (1915 in Aure – 2010) a Norwegian sculptor and art educator

References

External links

Municipal fact sheet from Statistics Norway 

 
Nordmøre
Municipalities of Møre og Romsdal
1838 establishments in Norway